Joseph Hunt may refer to: 
 Joseph Hunt (priest), English Anglican priest and master of Balliol College, Oxford
 Joseph Hunt (MP) (1762-1816) senior employee of the Admiralty forced to resign as an MP
 J. McVicker Hunt, American educational psychologist and author
 Joe Hunt (1919–1945), American tennis player and naval aviator
 Jody Hunt (born 1961), American lawyer and U.S. Department of Justice official
 Joseph Hunt (engineer) (born 1956), American engineer, NASA mission manager and flight director
 Joey Hunt, American football center

See also 
 Billionaire Boys Club, an investing and social club founded by Joseph Henry Hunt